Ruggero Grieco (19 August 1893 – 23 July 1955) was an Italian politician, antifascist, and member of the Italian Communist Party (Italian: Partito Comunista Italiano, PCI). He was born in Foggia, Apulia.

Early life
Grieco completed high school studies at the institute of agronomy. Aged 18 he came into contact with socialist circles and met Amadeo Bordiga. In 1912 he joined the Socialist Party. After Italy's entry in the First World War in 1915, Grieco served as a second lieutenant in the army.

Political career
In 1921 he took part in the founding of the Italian Communist Party. From 1921 he was a member of the party's central committee and executive committee, siding with Bordiga during the Livorno schism. In 1927 he became a member first of the party's politburo and then of its leadership. From 1924 to 1926 he was a parliamentary deputy.

Exile
Between 1926 and 1944 he was in exile in Switzerland. He became a member of the Foreign Center of the Italian Communist Party under the pseudonym "Garlandi." In 1928 he became a candidate member and in 1935 a member of the Executive Committee of the Communist International. During the Second World War he worked on radio system in Moscow, where he was in charge of broadcasts for Italy.

Return to Italy
In 1944 he returned to Italy and took over the propaganda section of the Communist Party and headed the agrarian committee of the Party's central committee. He was editor of the magazine La riforma agraria (Agrarian Reform). In 1946 he was elected to the Constituent Assembly and in 1948 became a senator.

Death
He died of a heart attack at Massa Lombarda, during a political meeting to mark the launch of the National Farmworkers' Alliance (Alleanza nazionale dei contadini)

Further reading (in Italian)
Giorgio Amendola. Storia del Partito Comunista Italiano 1921-1943, Roma, Editori Riuniti, 1966.
Giorgio Amendola, Scritti scelti. Roma, Editori Riuniti, 1966.
Paolo Spriano, Storia del Partito Comunista Italiano, Torino, Einaudi, 1967-1975
Michele Pistillo, Il pensiero e l'opera di Ruggero Grieco: Le Tesi agrarie di Lione, in «Rinascita», 46, 1983.
Michele Pistillo. Vita di Ruggero Grieco. Roma, Editori Riuniti, 1985.
Bruno Grieco, Un partito non stalinista, Pci 1936: «Appello ai fratelli in camicia nera», Venezia, Marsilio, 2004.

See also
Italian Communist Party
Amadeo Bordiga
Palmiro Togliatti
Antonio Gramsci
Antifascism

1893 births
1955 deaths
People from Foggia
Italian Socialist Party politicians
Italian Communist Party politicians
Deputies of Legislature XXVII of the Kingdom of Italy
Members of the National Council (Italy)
Members of the Constituent Assembly of Italy
Senators of Legislature I of Italy
Senators of Legislature II of Italy
Politicians of Apulia
Italian Aventinian secessionists